Neilos Kabasilas (also Nilus Cabasilas;  Neilos Kavasilas), was a fourteenth-century Greek Palamite theologian who succeeded Gregory Palamas as Metropolitan of Thessalonica (1361–1363). Neilos, who was called Nicholas as a layman, has often been confused with his nephew, the more famous Nicholas Kabasilas, best known for his Commentary on the Divine Liturgy

Neilos was a teacher of the famed translator of Thomas Aquinas into Greek, Demetrios Kydones. As a theologian, his most important works are a Theological Rule in defense of the essence-energies distinction and a series of discourses against the Filioque (the Latin teaching on the procession of the Holy Spirit).

References

 Théophile Kislas (Éd.), Nil Cabasilas, Sur le Saint-Esprit. Introduction, texte critique, traduction et notes (Paris, 2001).
 Manuel Candal, Nilus Cabasilas et theologia S. Thomae. De Processione Spiritus sancti (Rome, 1945).

14th-century births
Year of death unknown
Byzantine theologians
Byzantine writers
14th-century Byzantine bishops
14th-century Byzantine writers
Greek religious writers
Byzantine Thessalonian writers
Byzantine bishops of Thessalonica
Neilos
14th-century Eastern Orthodox theologians